Matteo Ruggeri (born 11 July 2002) is an Italian professional footballer who plays as a left-back for  club Atalanta.

Club career

Atalanta
Matteo Ruggeri grew up in Zogno, Lombardy, Italy, where he started playing football, before joining Atalanta's youth sector in 2011. He made his professional debut for Atalanta on 3 November 2020, coming on as a substitute in the 81st minute in a UEFA Champions League group stage match against Liverpool, which Atalanta lost 5–0 at home. Five days later, he made his Serie A debut in a 1–1 home draw against Inter.

Salernitana
On 27 July 2021, Ruggeri joined newly-promoted Serie A club Salernitana on a season-long loan.

Career statistics

Club

References

External links 
Profile at the Atalanta B.C. website
 

2002 births
Living people
Italian footballers
Italy youth international footballers
Association football fullbacks
Footballers from Lombardy
Atalanta B.C. players
U.S. Salernitana 1919 players
Serie A players